Socorro is a city in El Paso County, Texas, United States. It is located on the north bank of the Rio Grande southeast of El Paso, and on the border of Mexico. El Paso adjoins it on the west and the smaller city of San Elizario on the southeast; small unincorporated areas of El Paso County separate it from the nearby municipalities of Horizon City to the north and Clint to the east. As of the 2020 census, the city population was 34,306. By the 2010 census, the number had grown to 32,013. As of July 1, 2019, the population estimate for the city from the U.S. Census was 34,370. It is part of the El Paso Metropolitan Statistical Area. The city is El Paso County's second-largest municipality, after El Paso. It has a council-manager type of government with five city council members. Socorro is the 93rd-largest community in  Texas.

Geography
Socorro is located at  (31.641340, −106.274756).

History

Socorro was established in 1680 by local Manso and Piro Indians fleeing the Pueblo Revolt in northern New Mexico.  It took its name from Socorro, the town in central New Mexico from which the Piros had originated, which had been given the name Socorro (Spanish for "aid" or "succor") by the Spaniards due to the helpful attitude of the Piro toward the Spaniards at the time of first contact. The probable date of a Mass celebrated in the mission church of Nuestra Señora de la Limpia Concepción del Socorro, October 13, 1680, is regarded as the founding date of the city in Texas, called Socorro, established by the Spaniards and the Piro they brought south with them from New Mexico during the Pueblo Revolt. Socorro was first incorporated in 1871, and was reincorporated in 1985 in response to an annexation attempt from neighboring El Paso.

Demographics

2020 census

As of the 2020 United States census, there were 34,306 people, 9,964 households, and 8,442 families residing in the city. Socorro's population makes it the 93rd-largest city in Texas, or bigger than 94% of all Texas cities. From 2010 to 2020, the Socorro city population growth percentage was 7.2% (or from 32,013 people to 34,306 people).

2010 census
As of the census of 2010,  8,792 households and 7,703 families were residing in the city. The population density was 1,453.2 people/sq mi (560.9/km). The racial makeup of the city was 94.3% White, 0.2% African American, 1.6% Native American, 0.1% Asian, 2.9% from some other race, and 0.8% from two or more races. Hispanics or Latinos of any race were 96.7% of the population.

Of the 8,792 households,  56.5% had children under 18 living with them, 62.4% were married couples living together, 19.1% had a female householder with no husband present, and 12.4% were not families. About 10.9% of all households were made up of individuals, and 4.5% were someone living alone who was 65 or older. The average household size was 3.64, and the average family size was 3.93.

In the city, age distribution was 32.5% under  18, 11.4% from 18 to 24, 25.3% from 25 to 44, 21.9% from 45 to 64, and 8.7% who were 65 or older. The median age was 29.5 years. For every 100 females, there were 93.1 males. For every 100 females age 18 and over, there were 90.7 males.

For the period 2009–2011, the estimated median annual income for a household in the city was $30,014, and for a family was $30,998. Males had a median income of $26,239 versus $20,189 for females. The per capita income for the city was $11,455. About 29.3% of families and 32.0% of the population were below the poverty line, including 44.4% of those under age 18 and 29.2% of those age 65 or over.

Economy

Socorro is a city of sales and office employees, construction workers, builders, and service providers.

Points of interest

Bulldog Championship Park includes a splash park, an amphitheater, walking trails, and a pond.

Socorro Mission is a Franciscan mission built around 1840 to serve the Native American population in the area. The white adobe mission is a registered Texas historic landmark and one of three missions on the historic Mission Trail. In the mission stands a $300,000 replica of the Pieta. It is one of only 112 authorized replicas of the Pieta, finished by artist Michelangelo in 1499, which can be found in St. Peter's Basilica, Vatican City.

Socorro Entertainment Center is a Native American entertainment and concert venue. Past and upcoming concerts include national acts such as Counting Crows, Gipsy Kings, KC and the Sunshine Band, BB King, Everclear, Soul Asylum, and Toad the Wet Sprocket.

The city of Socorro was ranked the 22nd-most exciting city in Texas by Movoto in 2014.

 Socorro Entertainment Center
 Fiesta de San Miguel—Socorro Mission La Purisima—annual bazaar held in September with live music, dancing, food, drinks, games and rides

Parks

Bulldog Championship Park, the newest park in El Paso County, contains about 6.25 acres, and is located in the City of Socorro. Park amenities include an amphitheater, pavilions, a splash playground, playgrounds, detention pond, walking trails, and over 90 parking spaces.

Other parks include:
 Amistad Park
 Cougar Park
 Mauro Rosas Park
 Moon City Park
 Paradize Park
 Rio Bosque Wetlands Park
 Rio Vista Park
 Silvestre Reyes Park
 Valle Hermoso Park

Politics

The city of Socorro operates under a council–manager government. Citizens are represented on the city council by six elected members—the mayor and five city council members. The city council is responsible for setting policy and enacting ordinances for the benefit of the residents and businesses in Socorro. The city manager is responsible for the strategic management of the operating and administrative services and for executing the policies and laws of the council. The city manager oversees the provision of services, including police, public works, human resources, accounting/purchasing, and planning and zoning.

Current City Council members are:
 Mayor: Ivy Avalos
 District 1: Cesar Nevarez
 District 2: Alejandro Garcia
 District 3: Rudy Cruz JR.
 District 4: Yvonne Colon-Villalobos
 At-large: Ruben Reyes
 City Manager: Adriana Rodarte

Council members are elected to a four-year, staggered term.

The city maintains a police department of about 27 officers and a dozen civilian employees.

Sports
Socorro High School won the 5A Texas state baseball championship in 2009.

Education

Most of Socorro lies within the Socorro Independent School District, with northeast Socorro, including recently annexed areas north of Interstate 10 and between Interstate 10 and Clint, lying within the Clint Independent School District. The following schools, all in the Socorro Independent School District, serve the city of Socorro:

Zoned elementary schools:
 Escontrias Elementary School
 H.D. Hilley Elementary School
 Hueco Elementary School
 Robert R. Rojas Elementary School
 Ernesto Serna Elementary-Intermediate School
 Campestre Elementary School

The zoned middle schools are: Socorro Middle School, Salvador H. Sanchez Middle School, and Ernesto Serna Elementary-Intermediate School.

The sole zoned high school is Socorro High School.

Other Socorro ISD schools include: Escontrias Early Childhood and KEYS Elementary Academy.

The part of Socorro within the Clint Independent School District is zoned to Clint High School, Clint Junior High School, and Surratt Elementary School, all in Clint.

See also

 Socorro Mission

References

External links
 City of Socorro official website
 Mission Trail

Cities in El Paso County, Texas
Cities in Texas
Butterfield Overland Mail in Texas
San Antonio–El Paso Road
San Antonio–San Diego Mail Line
Stagecoach stops in the United States